The 1939–40 USC Trojans men's basketball team represented the University of Southern California during the 1939–40 NCAA men's basketball season in the United States. Their head coach was Sam Barry, coaching in his 11th season with the Trojans. The Trojans played their home games in the Shrine Auditorium in Los Angeles, California as members of the South division of the Pacific Coast Conference. The team finished the season 20–3, 10–2 in PCC play to win the South division. They swept North division champion Oregon State in the best of three series to win the PCC championship.  USC was invited to the NCAA tournament where they defeated Colorado before losing to Kansas in the Final Four. Despite the loss, they were named national champions by the Helms Athletic Foundation.

Forward Ralph Vaughn was named an All-American at the end of the season.

Schedule and results

|-
!colspan=9 style=|  Non-conference regular season

|-
!colspan=9 style=|PCC regular season

|-
!colspan=9 style=| PCC Divisional playoff

|-
!colspan=9 style=| NCAA tournament

Source

References

USC Trojans men's basketball seasons
NCAA Division I men's basketball tournament championship seasons
NCAA Division I men's basketball tournament Final Four seasons
Usc Trojans
Usc Trojans
Usc Trojans Men's Basketball
Usc Trojans Men's Basketball